Ann Rowan (1928/1929 - 10 August 2014) was an Irish actress. She was best known for her role as Julia Mac in the RTÉ television soap opera The Riordans. She also had roles in the television series Father Ted and Screen Two. She made appearances in the movies Ulysses (1967) and The Outsider (1980).

Rowan died on 10 August 2014 after a short illness. She is not to be confused with international author, Ann Rowan, who wrote Rapture Revelation published September 2014.

Filmography

References

External links

1920s births
2014 deaths
Irish film actresses
Irish television actresses
Irish stage actresses
Year of birth missing